Shakhtar, Shakhtyor or Shakhter (depending on transliteration from different languages) means "miner" in some Slavic languages and may refer to:  

FC Shakhtar Donetsk, a Ukrainian football club
MFC Shakhtar Donetsk, a Ukrainian futsal club
VC Shakhtar Donetsk, a defunct Ukrainian volleyball club
PFC Shakhtar Sverdlovsk, a Ukrainian football club
FC Shakhtyor Soligorsk, a Belarusian football club
HC Shakhtyor Soligorsk, a Belarusian hockey club
FC Shakhter Karagandy, a Kazakh football club
FC Shakhtyor Prokopyevsk, a former Russian football club
FC Shakhtyor Shakhty a former Russian football club that was known as FC Shakhtyor Shakhty from 1958 to 2004 and as FC Burevestnik-YuRGUES Shakhty from 2005 to 2006